MTZ may refer to

Manuel Turizo Zapata, Colombian singer also known as MTZ
Minsk Tractor Works, or Minski Traktarny Zavod (MTZ / МТЗ)
Mantle transition zone

See also
MTZ-RIPO,  Belarusian football club established in 2002, later renamed Partizan-MTZ Minsk and nw now renamed FC Partizan Minsk 
MTZ black hole, a black hole solution for (3+1)-dimensional gravity with a minimally coupled self-interacting scalar field, named after Cristian Martinez, Ricardo Troncoso and Jorge Zanelli